Lee Jin-woo (born 12 June 1986) is a South Korean speed skater. He competed in the men's 1500 metres event at the 2006 Winter Olympics.

References

1986 births
Living people
South Korean male speed skaters
Olympic speed skaters of South Korea
Speed skaters at the 2006 Winter Olympics
Place of birth missing (living people)